The British League Division Two Pairs Championship, named the National League Pairs Championship in the years that the second division was known as the National League was a motorcycle speedway contest between the top two riders from each club competing in the British League Division Two/New National League/National League in the United Kingdom.

Winners

See also
 List of United Kingdom Speedway Pairs champions
 Speedway in the United Kingdom
 Elite League Pairs Championship

References

Oakes, Peter (1991) The Complete History of the British League, Front Page Books, p. 15-16 (Championship Events section)

Speedway competitions in the United Kingdom